Nosratabad (also Romanized as Noşratābād and Nūsratābād; also known as Noşratābād-e Qārādāsh, Noşratābād-e Qardāsh, and Qārdāsh) is a village in Kharaqan-e Sharqi Rural District, Abgarm District, Avaj County, Qazvin Province, Iran. At the 2006 census, its population was 81, in 17 families.

References 

Populated places in Avaj County